Cheating Blondes is a 1933 American pre-Code mystery film directed by Joseph Levering and starring Thelma Todd, Ralf Harolde and Inez Courtney.

Cast
 Thelma Todd as Anne Merrick / Elaine Manners
 Ralf Harolde as Lawson Rolt
 Inez Courtney as Polly
 Milton Wallis as Mike Goldfish
 Mae Busch as Mrs. Jennie Carter
 Earl McCarthy as Gilbert Frayle
 William Humphrey as Jim - City Editor
 Dorothy Gulliver as Lita
 Brooks Benedict as Jim Carter
 Eddie Fetherston as Mitch
 Ben Savage as Ferdie
 Edna Murphy as	Girl

References

Bibliography
 Stephen Handzo. Hollywood and the Female Body: A History of Idolization and Objectification. McFarland, 2020.

External links
 

1933 films
1933 mystery films
American mystery films
Films directed by Joseph Levering
American black-and-white films
Majestic Pictures films
1930s English-language films
1930s American films